Ragnheiður Gestsdóttir (born 1 May 1953, in Reykjavik) is an Icelandic author, noted for her children's books.

Ragnheiður was born in a family of painters and writers. She graduated as a teacher from the Kennaraskóli Íslands in 1973, and took a degree in art history at Aarhus University in 1979. She also studied literature at the University of Iceland.

Ragnheiður worked as a teacher in Reykjavík for several years, and was editor of Iceland's National Centre for Educational Materials 1990–96. She has both illustrated and written books for children and teens.

Her first book, Ljósin lifna, was published in 1985. Ragnheiður has retold and illustrated various Icelandic folktales, pre-eminently in her book Sagan af Hlina konungssyni. Amongst other prizes, Ragnheiður won the Icelandic Children's Book Prize for her 2000 book Leikur á borði; and the Nordic Children's Book Prize in 2005 for her novel Sverðberinn. Her most recent novels include the 2009 Hjartsláttur and the 2012 Myndin í speglinum.

Ragnheiður lives in Hafnarfjörður. She is married and has four children.

Prizes

 2005 - Nordic Children's Book Prize: Sverðberinn
 2005 - Vorvindar IBBY
 2004 - Barnabókaverðlaun Fræðsluráðs Reykjavíkur: Sverðberinn
 2001 - Barnabókaverðlaun Fræðsluráðs Reykjavíkur: 40 vikur
 2000 - Íslensku barnabókaverðlaunin: Leikur á borði

References

Living people
1953 births
Ragnheidur Gestsdottir
Ragnheidur Gestsdottir
Ragnheidur Gestsdottir
Ragnheidur Gestsdottir
Icelandic women children's writers
Ragnheidur Gestsdottir